Some Echoes is the fourth full-length album by Ohio band Aloha. It was released on April 11, 2006 by Polyvinyl Record Co.

It received mostly favorable reviews, with a score of 78/100 on Metacritic.

Track listing
"Brace Your Face" – 6:27
"Big Morning" – 1:52
"Your Eyes" – 4:19
"Ice Storming" – 4:22
"Between the Walls" – 2:44
"Come Home" – 5:59
"Weekend" – 3:15
"Summer Lawn" – 3:01
"If I Lie Down" – 3:42
"Mountain" – 3:18

Personnel

Performers 
 Cale Parks
 Matthew Gengler
 T.J. Lipple
 Tony Cavallario

Other
 Mixed by T.J. Lipple
 Mastered by Chad Clark
 Art by Melina Ausikaitis
 Design by Ben Yonda

References 

2006 albums
Aloha (band) albums